James Jezreel, born James Rowland White (c. 1851 – 2 March 1885), was a nineteenth-century soldier and self-proclaimed prophet.

Life

Jezreel started off as a follower of John Wroe signing as a member of the Christian Israelite Church at Chatham, Kent on 15 October 1875. In the 1880s, White chose the name 'James Jershom Jezreel' as he became convinced that he was a prophet. His followers, known as the Jezreelites, were mainly concentrated in Kent and the south-east of England. A temple was built, Jezreel's Tower, in Gillingham, Kent.

Further reading
 The tower of mystery surrenders its secrets by Stephen Rayner, Memories page, Medway News, May 2006 
The Sixth Trumpeter by PJ Rogers 
The Times 
D Roberts, Observations on the Divine Mission of Joanna Southcott (1807) 
R Reece, Correct Statement of the Circumstances attending the Death of Joanna Southcott (1815) 
Library of Biography. Remarkable Women of different Nations and Ages. First Series. Boston. John P Jewett and Co. (1858)

References

1885 deaths
British Army soldiers
Prophets
1851 births